Rock Bible is the third studio album by American heavy metal band the Mentors. The lyrical content changed from sexism to the band's personal turmoil, although there were some sexist songs and one, "My Daughter Is a Strawberry", had racist lyrics (tongue in cheek, as Insect on Acid, who is African-American, was a member of the band during this time period):

It was only available on cassette on its original release. Rick Lomas (Insect on Acid) plays drums on most tracks, due to El Duce's increasing struggles with alcoholism. Bootleggers sold bad-quality MP3 rips of the tape bundled with the Get Up and Die EP as CDs before an official CD version was released in 2007, remastered from the original cassette.

Lyrics from "Cardboard Condo" were reused in the track "Living on Welfare" from El Duce's 1993 solo album Slave to Thy Master.

Track listing

Demo tape 

A demo tape from the sessions that produced this album, recorded in 1989, exists. The tape was acquired by a Mentors fan from a friend of the band in 1993, before being uploaded to the Internet ten years later. It contains unmixed versions of "Constantly Jackin'", "Chicks with Dicks", "Panhandler", and "Cardboard Condo", as well as 3 otherwise unreleased tracks: "Million Dollar High", "Eddie Anaconda", and "Airhead Stare". The tape also contains studio chatter, of which remnants can be heard in the released album. "Million Dollar High" would later see official release as a bonus track on the 2019 CD reissue of Houses of the Horny.

Track listing

Personnel 
 El Duce — lead vocals, drums on Jump Through the Hoops and Hilljack Heaven
 Sickie Wifebeater — guitar
 Dr. Heathen Scum — bass
 Insect on Acid — keyboards/Drums on all other tracks

1990 albums
Mentors (band) albums